Time in Laos is given by Indochina Time (ICT) (UTC+07:00). Laos does not observe daylight saving time. Laos shares the same time zone with Cambodia, Thailand, Vietnam, Christmas Island, and Western Indonesia.

References

Laos
Time in Southeast Asia